The following lists events that happened during 2016 in the Democratic Republic of the Congo.

Incumbents 
 President: Joseph Kabila
 Prime Minister: Augustin Matata Ponyo, Samy Badibanga

Events

March
20 March – The presidential and legislative is postponed
26 March – Voting is held for the gubernatorial elections in 20 out of 21 reformed provinces of the DRC.

April
24 April - Darryl Lewis, an American citizen and a US military veteran, is arrested at a rally for Moïse Katumbi in Lubumbashi. He was held for six weeks accused of being a mercenary, and released after diplomatic intervention.

July
 10 July - Violence breaks out again between Bantu and Pygmies
 29 July -Lewis files suit against Congolese Justice Minister Alexis Thambwe Mwamba and Kalev Mutond, head of the Agence Nationale de Renseignements (ANR), the secret services, under the Torture Victim Protection Act.

August
16 August - Beni massacre
18 August - Protests about Beni massacre.

October
18 October - 20 people are killed in Tanganyika Province after clashes between Pygmy and Bantu militias.

November
27 November - 30 civilians, mostly Hutus, are killed by an ethnic Nande militia in the east of the country.

December
5 December - 31 people are killed in clashes between government and militia forces in Kasai Province.

References

 
2010s in the Democratic Republic of the Congo
Years of the 21st century in the Democratic Republic of the Congo
Democratic Republic of the Congo
Democratic Republic of the Congo